Ami Vitale is an American photojournalist, documentary filmmaker, educator and speaker. In 2018, she published a photo book titled Panda Love which captures pandas within captivity and being released into the wild.

Early life and education
Vitale was born in Florida. She realized the potential of photography at a young age.

She has a degree in International Studies from the University of North Carolina.

Photography and filmmaking
In 1994, Vitale joined the Associated Press (AP) as a picture editor in New York and Washington, D.C. She self funded her travel through her work with AP and left for the Czech Republic in 1997.

She moved to Prague, Czech Republic, and spent a year covering the war in Kosovo, traveling back and forth to Prague, and spending a month at a time in the war zone. She later traveled to Angola, and then to the second Intifada in Gaza and Israel. In 2000, she received an Alexia Foundation grant to document a small village in the West African nation of Guinea Bissau.

Vitale currently photographs wildlife and environmental stories in order to educate about global conservation issues. She is a visual journalist working as a photographer for National Geographic, a documentary filmmaker, and a cinematographer. Her recent still photography focuses on wildlife conservation in Africa, the Middle East, and Asia. As an ambassador for Nikon and a contract photographer with National Geographic magazine, she has documented wildlife and poaching in Africa, covered human-wildlife conflict, and concentrated on efforts to save the northern white rhino and reintroduce pandas to the wild.

Vitale is a founding member of Ripple Effect Images, as well as a member of the Photojournalism Advisory Council for the Alexia Foundation.

Writing
Vitale is an author, contributor and frequently writes corresponding articles with her photojournalistic works.

Publications

Books by Vitale
Panda Love: the Secret Lives of Pandas (2018) – author, photographer

Books with contributions of photography by Vitale
Associated Press: Guide to Photojournalism (2000) by Brian Horton
National Geographic: The Most Popular Instagram Photos (2016)

Films
 Independent Lens (2010) – camera development
 PBS Frontline World (2007) – reporter
 Bangladesh: A Climate Trap (2019) – director, co-writer
 Shaba (2021) – director

Awards
2003: General News, third prize stories, World Press Photo, Amsterdam
2005: People in the News, second prize stories, World Press Photo, Amsterdam
2015: Nature, second prize singles, World Press Photo, Amsterdam
2017: Nature, second prize stories, World Press Photo, Amsterdam
2017: Science & Natural History Picture Story, third place, Pictures of the Year International
2018: Nature, first prize stories, World Press Photo, Amsterdam
2020: Wildlife Photographer of the Year, nomination
2020: National Geographic Photo of the Decade

References

External links 
 
 Digital Journalist Ami Vitale: Getting Beyond the Headlines by Susan Markisz, January 2003

1971 births
Living people
Place of birth missing (living people)
American photojournalists
American women photographers
Madeira School alumni
National Geographic people
University of Miami alumni
University of North Carolina alumni
War photographers
Photographers from Montana
Women photojournalists